Oak Glen is a census-designated place situated between the San Bernardino Mountains and the Little San Bernardino Mountains in San Bernardino County, California, United States. The population was 638 at the 2010 census.

The original settlers, the Cahuilla and the Serrano, harvested acorns; many metates can still be found in the streambeds where the acorns were leached.  According to Huell Howser's 2005 California's Gold profile, the potato was the original crop grown by the first Caucasians to settle in the area.

The apple orchards produce the Vasquez and King David varieties, which are grown only in Oak Glen, as well as antique varieties no longer commercially available such as Ben Davis, Gravenstein, and Pink Pearl.

Although Oak Glen grew apples mainly for export, in the 1940s several farms began to sell apples, apple pies, apple cider and apple butter at roadside stands. The export trade has virtually disappeared, and growers now earn much of their revenue from visitors who are allowed to pick apples directly off the trees at some of the orchards.

History 
One of the most scenic historic spots in Southern California is nestled in the heart of apple country in Oak Glen, California where the summers are cooler and the winters dusted with snow. The five mile scenic loop of 30+ ranches, farms and businesses are open year-round. You will see one of the most scenic byways Southern California has to offer.

Enoch Parrish opened the first apple orchard in 1876, followed by the Wilshire family. The Rivers brothers and their families came to Oak Glen in 1906. Their orchard, Los Rios Rancho (Spanish for "The Rivers Ranch"), is still in operation, as are many of the other original orchards and ranches in the area. The Law family came into the area with its own apple orchard in the early 1930s and built the first roadside packinghouse, first restaurant and gift shop soon after. Various other shops.

In 1996, The Wildlands Conservancy acquired Los Rios Rancho to ensure the rural feel was retained. The orchard is leased for apple growing. The conservancy opened Oak Glen Preserve to the public providing hiking trails and picnic areas. They acquired additional land in the area particularly peaks to ensure the scenic backdrop persists. A large number of families visit Oak Glen for festivities and events offered by Los Rios Rancho and The Wildlands Conservancy.

Los Rios Rancho a 103-year-old ranch; Southern California's largest historical apple ranch, located in the heart of apple country, draws more than 300,000 visitors yearly who make the scenic drive to Oak Glen to pick apples, picnic and hike as well as enjoy the homemade apple pies and freshly pressed cider. Joseph E. Wilshire, who helped make the Oak Glen area famous for apple growing in the early 1900s had realized early on the suitability of The Glen for growing bountiful apples and began buying land where with his brothers George, Henry and Edward began the Wilshire legacy.

The original settlers to Oak Glen were the Cahuilla and the Serrano. They harvested acorns for survival in Oak Glen. The unique climate and elevation was perfect for growing large black acorns, a favorite among the locals. The evidence can still be found along the streambeds where the acorns were leached over 100 years ago. Although the main crop of Oak Glen was apples since the 1940s, it hasn't always been Oak Glen's only crop. The potato along with many other crops, were grown in Oak Glen since the 1890s. After several farms began to sell apples individually to visitors, along with homemade apple pies, fresh apple cider and delicious apple butter from roadside stands Oak Glen became an apple boom town overnight. The export trade has since virtually disappeared, and growers now earn much of their revenue from visitors who are allowed to pick the apples directly from the trees to insure freshness and the best quality. Today many of the heirloom varieties still exist today even though many of them have been since lost in time. Such varieties, which are grown only in Oak Glen, as well as many heirloom varieties no longer commercially available or are hard to find, such as the Arkansas Black and the Glen Seedling favorites among many.
According to the Los Angeles Times, the town in Tamara Thorne's horror novel Moonfall is based on Oak Glen.

Geography
According to the United States Census Bureau, the CDP covers an area of 15.1 square miles (39.2 km), 99.97% of it land, and 0.03% of it water.

Demographics
The 2010 United States Census reported that Oak Glen had a population of 638. The racial makeup of Oak Glen was 545 (85.4%) White (68.5% Non-Hispanic White), 50 (7.8%) African American, 13 (2.0%) Native American, 2 (0.3%) Asian, 1 (0.2%) Pacific Islander, 14 (2.2%) from other races, and 13 (2.0%) from two or more races. Hispanic or Latino of any race were 123 persons (19.3%).

The Census reported that 482 people (75.5% of the population) lived in households, 0 (0%) lived in non-institutionalized group quarters, and 156 (24.5%) were institutionalized.

There were 190 households, out of which 42 (22.1%) had children under the age of 18 living in them, 127 (66.8%) were opposite-sex married couples living together, 8 (4.2%) had a female householder with no husband present, 9 (4.7%) had a male householder with no wife present. There were 7 (3.7%) unmarried opposite-sex partnerships, and 2 (1.1%) same-sex married couples or partnerships. 40 households (21.1%) were made up of individuals, and 16 (8.4%) had someone living alone who was 65 years of age or older. The average household size was 2.54. There were 144 families (75.8% of all households); the average family size was 2.88.

The population was spread out, with 72 people (11.3%) under the age of 18, 76 people (11.9%) aged 18 to 24, 167 people (26.2%) aged 25 to 44, 236 people (37.0%) aged 45 to 64, and 87 people (13.6%) who were 65 years of age or older. The median age was 45.4 years. For every 100 females, there were 171.5 males. For every 100 females age 18 and over, there were 180.2 males.

There were 214 housing units at an average density of 14.2 per square mile (5.5/km), of which 142 (74.7%) were owner-occupied, and 48 (25.3%) were occupied by renters. The homeowner vacancy rate was 3.4%; the rental vacancy rate was 4.0%. 348 people (54.5% of the population) lived in owner-occupied housing units and 134 people (21.0%) lived in rental housing units.

According to the 2010 United States Census, Oak Glen had a median household income of $70,189, with none of the population living below the federal poverty line.

References

Further reading
Oak Glen and Los Rios Rancho by J.R. Sanders

External links 

 San Bernardino County Oak Glen Community Plan

Census-designated places in San Bernardino County, California
Census-designated places in California